Baitul Ghafur Mosque is an Ahmadi Muslim mosque in Ginsheim, in the German state of Hesse.

References

2011 establishments in Germany
Ahmadiyya mosques in Germany
Religious buildings and structures in Hesse
Mosques completed in 2011